Russell Gardens is a village on the Great Neck Peninsula in the Town of North Hempstead, in Nassau County, on the North Shore of Long Island, in New York, United States. The population was 945 at the 2010 census.

The area was proposed to become part of neighboring Thomaston in that village's original incorporation plans – but residents objected and decided instead to incorporate Russell Gardens as a separate village that same year.

History 
Russell Gardens was originally developed by Francis H. Knighton, who had previously played a small role in the Rickert–Finlay Realty Company, which developed the nearby community of Kensington. 

The majority of the 135-acre (55 ha) area now encompassing the village was originally part of the estate of Captain Frederick Russell. The estate had previously been owned by the Schenck family and subsequently by the Haviland family. Other areas were purchased from Arthur Cushman, as well as from others. After purchasing the land, Knighton quickly started to develop it, and chose to name his development after Captain Russel by naming it Russell Gardens; the name would become Russell Gardens, Incorporated when Knighton opted to incorporate the syndicate which had been assisting him in the financing of his endeavors.

The group would continue developing the community, laying out streets, utilities, and parkland. They opted to place all of the community's wiring underground and had landscaper J.J. Levinson landscape for the community.

In 1931, around the same time when neighboring Thomaston proposed incorporating itself and potentially taking in this development as part of their village, the residents felt that in order to maintain the character of their community, it would be imperative for them to incorporate Russell Gardens as a separate village in order to create and pass their own zoning ordinances. Subsequently, the majority of Russell Gardens residents ultimately voted in favor of incorporation that year, and Russell Gardens officially became its own incorporated village.

Geography

Demographics

As of the census of 2000, there were 1,074 people, 400 households, and 296 families residing in the village. The population density was 5,865.0 people per square mile (2,303.7/km2). There were 409 housing units at an average density of 2,233.5 per square mile (877.3/km2). The racial makeup of the village was 85.94% White, 0.56% African American, 0.09% Native American, 10.61% Asian, 0.09% Pacific Islander, 1.02% from other races, and 1.68% from two or more races. Hispanic or Latino of any race were 5.03% of the population.

There were 400 households, out of which 39.3% had children under the age of 18 living with them, 68.5% were married couples living together, 4.0% had a female householder with no husband present, and 26.0% were non-families. 24.3% of all households were made up of individuals, and 11.5% had someone living alone who was 65 years of age or older. The average household size was 2.66 and the average family size was 3.19.

In the village, the population was spread out, with 26.7% under the age of 18, 3.9% from 18 to 24, 25.1% from 25 to 44, 27.5% from 45 to 64, and 16.8% who were 65 years of age or older. The median age was 42 years. For every 100 females, there were 102.3 males. For every 100 females age 18 and over, there were 91.0 males.

The median income for a household in the village was $108,427, and the median income for a family was $142,636. Males had a median income of $100,000 versus $56,250 for females. The per capita income for the village was $58,680. About 2.4% of families and 3.7% of the population were below the poverty line, including 1.0% of those under age 18 and 13.0% of those age 65 or over.

Government

Village government 
As of September 2021, the Mayor of Russell Gardens is David Miller, the Deputy Mayor is Lawrence Chaleff, and the Village Trustees are Martin Adickman, Matthew Ellis, and Jane Krakauer.

Representation in higher government

Town representation 
Russell Gardens is located in the Town of North Hempstead's 5th district, which as of September 2021 is represented on the Town Board by Lee R. Seeman (D–Great Neck).

Nassau County representation 
Russell Gardens is located in Nassau County's 10th Legislative district, which as of January 2023 is represented in the Nassau County Legislature by Mazi Melesa Pilip (R–Great Neck).

New York State representation

New York State Assembly 
Russell Gardens is located in the New York State Assembly's 16th Assembly district, which as of September 2021 is represented by Gina Sillitti (D–Manorhaven).

New York State Senate 
Russell Gardens is located in the New York State Senate's 7th State Senate district, which as of September 2021 is represented in the New York State Senate by Anna Kaplan (D–North Hills).

Federal representation

United States Congress 
Russell Gardens is located in New York's 3rd congressional district, which as of September 2021 is represented in the United States Congress by Tom Suozzi (D–Glen Cove).

United States Senate 
Like the rest of New York, Russell Gardens is represented in the United States Senate by Charles Schumer (D) and Kirsten Gillibrand (D).

Politics 
In the 2016 U.S. presidential election, the majority of Russell Gardens voters voted for Hillary Clinton (D).

Education

School district 
Russell Gardens is located entirely within the boundaries of the Great Neck Union Free School District. As such, all children who reside within the village and attend public schools go to Great Neck's schools.

Library district 
Russell Gardens is located within the boundaries of the Great Neck Library District.

Infrastructure

Transportation

Road 
Northern Boulevard (New York State Route 25A) passes through the hamlet and forms part of its northern boundary. Other major roads include Great Neck Road and Middle Neck Road.

Rail 
There are no train stations located within the village. The nearest Long Island Rail Road stations are Great Neck and Little Neck on the Port Washington Branch.

Bus 
The n20G bus route travels along Northern Boulevard and Middle Neck Road through Russell Gardens. This bus line is operated by Nassau Inter-County Express (NICE). Additionally, NICE's n20h, n21, n25, and n26 bus routes run through a small section of the northwestern portion of the village, along Middle Neck Road.

Utilities

Natural gas 
National Grid USA provides natural gas to homes and businesses that are hooked up to natural gas lines in Russell Gardens.

Power 
PSEG Long Island provides power to all homes and businesses within Russell Gardens.

Sewage 
Russell Gardens is connected to sanitary sewers. These sewers are operated by the Belgrave Sewer District.

Water 
Russell Gardens is served by the Manhasset–Lakeville Water District.

References

External links 

 Official website

Great Neck Peninsula
Villages in New York (state)
Villages in Nassau County, New York